Liam McNamara (born 9 February 1997 in Australia) is an international rugby union player. His playing position is wing or full back.

Rugby union career

Amateur career

McNamara began his career playing for Sunnybank Rugby, and returned to playing there after injury.

Professional career

He played for Queensland Country in 2016-17 season. He also played for Brisbane City in the 2019-20 season. He was named in the Queensland Reds squad for week 15 in 2019. After injurying his ACL he undertook rehabilitation and then played for Sunnybank to regain his fitness.

He moved to Scotland in 2021 to play for the Ayrshire Bulls in the Super 6. As a reward for his good form he was selected to play in a Glasgow Warriors - Edinburgh rugby fixture at the end of the 2021-22 season. This was a friendly match, picking the best players from the Super 6, to see if they could make the step up to the Scottish United Rugby Championship sides. As McNamara played for Ayrshire Bulls in the Glasgow's side catchment, he turned out for Glasgow Warriors.

International career

McNamara played for Australia U20s in 2016.
He was capped by the Australia 7s side in 2016 and played with the 7s side through to 2019.

After a three-year break from international rugby, McNamara began playing for the Ireland national rugby sevens team in 2023.

References

External links

Rugby.com.au profile
itsrugby.co.uk profile

1997 births
Australian rugby union players
Living people
Rugby union wings
Queensland Reds players
Ayr RFC players
Australia international rugby sevens players